This is a list of launches made by the Long March rocket family between 2000 and 2009.

Launch statistics

Rocket configurations

Launch outcomes

Launch history

2000

|}

2001

|}

2002

|}

2003

|}

2004

|}

2005

|}

2006

|}

2007

|}

2008

|}

2009

|}

References

Sources 

 
 
 

Space program of the People's Republic of China
Long March